Macpherson Stadium, located in Browns Summit, North Carolina's Bryan Park (Browns Summit is a suburb of Greensboro), is a USL League Two stadium that seats 7,000 and is the home to PDL club North Carolina Fusion U23 and the Greensboro College men's soccer team.  Prior to the opening of Macpherson Stadium, the team played at UNCG Soccer Stadium. The stadium hosted the soccer events for the 2007 State Games of North Carolina.

On February 12, 2008 the Dynamo announced plans to expand the stadium to 7,000 seats after the 2008 season from its previous capacity of 3000 all seated. 

Macpherson Stadium will be one of the hosts for the 2020 NCAA Division I Men's Soccer Tournament and the 2020 NCAA Division I Women's Soccer Tournament.

References

External links
 
 
 Carolina Dynamo
 Macpherson Stadium

Soccer venues in North Carolina
Sports venues in Greensboro, North Carolina
College soccer venues in the United States
North Carolina Fusion U23
Sports venues completed in 2002
2002 establishments in North Carolina